Copycat Killer is a remix extended play by American singer-songwriter Phoebe Bridgers featuring American multi-instrumentalist and arranger Rob Moose. It was released on November 20, 2020 through Dead Oceans, with a vinyl version following on December 4, 2020. The EP features orchestral reworks of four songs from Bridgers' second studio album Punisher with new arrangements by Moose.

Promotion
The EP was originally announced on November 10, 2020, with the Copycat Killer version of "Kyoto" was released as a promotional single with a music video on the same day.

Critical reception

The EP received a score of 73/100 from review aggregate site Metacritic, indicating "generally favorable reviews". Will Richards of NME praised the new arrangements, saying "this expansion of her sound opens the door for her to go anywhere she pleases in the future. Rarely does a remix EP recalibrate songs so thoroughly while maintaining every inch of their magic, but we should expect the unexpected from Phoebe Bridgers by now." Alex Rigotti of Gigwise was more lukewarm towards the collection, calling it "a gorgeous rearrangement of her songs, but it adds little dimension to the world of Punisher". Katherine Rodgers complimented "Kyoto" and "Saviour Complex", but said that "Chinese Satellite" didn't add much to the original, and "'Punisher' has too delicate a melody to withstand much embellishment".

Track listing

Charts

References

2020 EPs
Dead Oceans albums
Phoebe Bridgers albums
Remix EPs
Remix albums by American artists
EPs by American artists